The 1992 Virginia Slims of Florida was a women's tennis tournament played on outdoor hard courts at the Polo Club in Boca Raton, Florida in the United States that was part of Tier I of the 1992 WTA Tour. It was the 14th edition of the tournament and was held from March 2 through March 8, 1992. First-seeded Steffi Graf won the singles title, her third at the event after 1987 and 1989, and earned $110,000 first-prize money as well as 400 ranking points.

Finals

Singles

 Steffi Graf defeated  Conchita Martínez 3–6, 6–2, 6–0
 It was Graf's 1st title of the year and the 62nd of her career.

Doubles

 Larisa Neiland /  Natasha Zvereva defeated  Linda Harvey-Wild /  Conchita Martínez 6–2, 6–2

References

External links
 ITF tournament edition details
 Tournament draws

Virginia Slims of Florida
Virginia Slims of Florida
Virginia Slims of Florida
Virginia Slims of Florida
Virginia Slims of Florida